John Richard Steffy (May 1, 1924 Lancaster, Pennsylvania – November 29, 2007 Bryan, Texas) was an American nautical archaeologist.

He attended the Milwaukee School of Engineering.
He taught at University of Pennsylvania.
He founded the Institute of Nautical Archaeology, with Michael L. Katzev, and George Bass.
He was Professor Emeritus at Texas A&M University, and creator of the Ship Reconstruction Laboratory.

He married Lucille Koch Steffy, (died in 1991).

Awards
 1985 MacArthur Fellows Program

Works
Wooden Ship Building and the Interpretation of Shipwrecks, College Station: Texas A&M University Press, 1994.

References

External links
"Steffy's legacy lives on", The Eagle, APRIL AVISON, November 30, 2007

1924 births
2007 deaths
People from Lancaster, Pennsylvania
University of Pennsylvania faculty
Texas A&M University faculty
MacArthur Fellows
Maritime archaeology
20th-century American archaeologists
Historians from Texas
Milwaukee School of Engineering alumni